Grudge Match is a 2013 film starring Sylvester Stallone and Robert De Niro.

Grudge Match may also refer to:
 The Grudge Match, a 1991 television game show
 "Grudge Match", a 2003 episode of Kim Possible
 "Grudge Match", a 2005 episode of Teenage Mutant Ninja Turtles
 "Grudge Match", a 2006 episode of Justice League Unlimited
 "Grudge Match", a 2006 episode of Ben 10